Nădlac sausage is a traditional Romanian sausage made with pork's meat from Nădlac in Arad County.

The recipe is attested since the sixteenth century in Germany, has been improved upon, by Romanians. Nădlac sausage is greater, spiced with garlic, mustard, pepper, caraway, salt and sugar are added to the conservation process, and for tastes.

Maturation which includes smoking and drying, takes between four and six months where it loses about 40% of its weight. Nădlac sausage is smoked traditionally in summer with sawdust natural, usually plum, mulberry or beech.

In Romania, Nădlac sausage is registered as a traditional product.

See also
 List of sausages
 List of smoked foods

Notes and references 

Romanian delicatessen
Romanian sausages
Smoked meat
Fermented sausages